The Rainbow Tour is the fourth headlining concert tour by American recording artist Kesha, in support of her third studio album Rainbow (2017). It was her first solo tour since the Warrior Tour in 2013. The tour started in Birmingham on September 26, 2017, and ended on November 16, 2019. Tickets ranged from $42 to $2,484 on the secondary ticket market.

Background and development
Since 2014, Kesha has been involved in a legal battle against her former producer and longtime collaborator Dr. Luke. This legal dispute has put her career on hold. To reconnect with her fans, Kesha embarked on the Kesha and the Creepies: Fuck the World Tour, which took place in North America and Asia between 2016 and 2017. In October 2016, it was revealed that Kesha has written and given to her label 22 new songs.

On July 6, 2017, the lead single "Praying" from Rainbow was released. On August 1, four days prior the release of her album, Kesha announced the tour, revealing tour dates in North America. Shows in Europe, Oceania and Asia were later added.

On February 20, 2018, Kesha announced that her planned shows in Australia, New Zealand, Taiwan and Japan are temporarily canceled and will be rescheduled due to an imminent knee surgery in order to repair her torn ACL. On March 23, 2018, Kesha announced the rescheduled dates in Australia and Asia, set to take place in October. She rescheduled the shows in Adelaide, Melbourne, Sydney, and Brisbane, and cancelled the shows in Perth and Auckland, New Zealand. She was also scheduled to perform at Bluefest in Byron Bay in March, but that date was also cancelled.
Kesha later added shows in South Korea and China, as well as a festival date in Japan. Unfortunately, since Kesha had not yet acclimatized to the food and weather, she had to cancel the already rescheduled Taipei show 20 minutes before she was due to take the stage, as well as cancelling the entirety of her four date China tour. Kesha's official site says that the show in Chengdu, China is postponed and not cancelled, but it is unknown if the show will be rescheduled.

Set list 
This set list is from the show on September 27, 2017 in Nashville. It is not intended to represent all concerts for the tour.

 "Woman"
 "Boogie Feet"
 "Learn to Let Go"
 "Hymn"
 "Let 'Em Talk"
 "Take It Off"
 "We R Who We R"
 "Spaceship"
 "Hunt You Down" / "Timber"
 "Godzilla"
 "Your Love Is My Drug"
 "Blow"
 "Praying"
Encore
"Rainbow"
 "Tik Tok"
 "Bastards"

Tour dates

Cancelled shows

Notes

References

Kesha concert tours
2017 concert tours
2018 concert tours
2019 concert tours